Dixie Lullabies is an album by the American southern rock/country rock band The Kentucky Headhunters. It was released on October 18, 2011 through Red Dirt Records.

Critical reception
AllMusic gave the album three-and-a-half stars out of five and in its review by William Ruhlmann, he thought that the songs were "steeped in familiar structures" and "will fit right in with the band's earlier material". An identical rating came from Jonathan Keefe of Slant Magazine, who said that "What the album lacks in surprises it makes up for in pure, unadulterated swagger" and that the Headhunters "are still one of the finest Southern-rock outfits around."

Track listing
All tracks written by The Kentucky Headhunters; co-writers in parentheses.
"Dixie Lullaby" — 2:41
"Boones Farm Boogie" — 3:14
"Great Acoustics" — 3:46
"Tumblin' Roses" (John Fred Young) — 3:38
"Les Paul Standard" — 3:18
"In a Perfect World" — 3:33
"Roll On Little Pretty" (Wayd Battle, Daryll Meadows) — 3:26
"Sugar Daddy" — 3:15
"Just Another Night" — 4:13
"Little Miss Blues Breaker" — 2:54
"Little Angel" (Anthony Kenney) — 3:41
"Just Believe" — 4:30
"Ain't That a Shame" — 2:32
"Recollection Blues" — 4:24

Personnel
Compiled from liner notes and backing card.

The Kentucky Headhunters
Greg Martin — lead guitar, background vocals
Doug Phelps — bass guitar, lead vocals (tracks 1, 3, 5, 7-9, 12, 13), background vocals
Fred Young — drums, background vocals
Richard Young — rhythm guitar, lead vocals (tracks 1, 2, 4, 6, 10, 11, 14), background vocals

Note: Doug Phelps and Richard Young sing a unison lead vocal on "Dixie Lullaby".
Additional musicians
The Farm Young Quartet (Fred, Marla, Rachel and Audrey Young) — background vocals
"Cowboy" Eddie Long — steel guitar
Kevin McKendree — piano, organ
Richie Owens — mandolin

Chart performance

References

2011 albums
The Kentucky Headhunters albums